Omar Saavedra Santis (15 July 1944 – 23 December 2021) was a Chilean writer. He spent many years in exile in Europe after the CIA-backed coup that toppled the government of Salvador Allende in 1973. He won numerous literary prizes, among them the Anna Seghers Prize. His daughter is the actress Catalina Saavedra. 

Saavedra died on 23 December 2021, at the age of 77.

References

1944 births
2021 deaths
Place of birth missing
20th-century Chilean dramatists and playwrights
20th-century Chilean male writers
Chilean male dramatists and playwrights
People from Valparaíso